Bacillus licheniformis is a bacterium commonly found in the soil. It is found on bird feathers, especially chest and back plumage, and most often in ground-dwelling birds (like sparrows) and aquatic species (like ducks).

It is a gram-positive, mesophilic bacterium. Its optimal growth temperature is around 50 °C, though it can survive at much higher temperatures. The optimal temperature for enzyme secretion is 37 °C. It can exist in a dormant spore form to resist harsh environments, or in a vegetative state when conditions are good.

High capacity of secretion of the alkaline serine protease has made B. licheniformis one of the most important  bacteria in industrial enzyme production.  Subtilisin Carlsberg secreted by B. licheniformis is used as a detergent protease. It is sold under the name Alcalase by Novozymes. A small antisense RNA against Subtilisin Carlsberg named BLi_r0872 was  discovered in an RNA-seq based study. It may have a putative impact on protease production and serve as target for strain improvement.

Scientists are currently exploring its ability to degrade feathers for agricultural purposes. Feathers contain high amounts of non-digestible proteins, but researchers hope that, through fermentation with B. licheniformis, they can use waste feathers to produce cheap and nutritious feather meal to feed livestock.

Ecological research is also being done looking at the interaction between plumage colors and B. licheniformis activity, and the consequences thereof. Feather degrading bacteria may have played an important role in the evolution of molting, and patterns in feather coloration (Gloger's Rule).

Description 
B. licheniformis is a Gram positive, spore-forming, facultative anaerobic, rod-shaped bacterium. It was initially named Clostridium licheniforme by H. Weigmann and renamed Bacillus licheniformis by Frederick D. Chester. B. licheniformis displays a variety of colony morphologies, with the rough "licheniform" colonies giving the organism its name. Colonies tend to be cream-colored, but will turn red in the presence of iron in media, most likely as a result of pulcherrimin. B. licheniformis is found in a wide variety of environments, but especially in soil and in the feathers of birds, where B. licheniformis degrades β-keratin. There is evidence that red feathers, with psittacofulvin, are more resistant to degradation.

Applications

Industrial Enzymes 
Subtilisin Carlsberg, a serine protease secreted by B. licheniformis, is used in laundry detergent formulations due to its ability to perform at high pH levels (optimal activity is between 8.0 and 10.0) and high temperatures (40-50 Celsius). Amylases are also synthesized by B. licheniformis and used for industrial purposes.

Probiotics 
B. licheniformis is used as a probiotic in animal feed, where isolates have been shown to prevent disease and promote growth as well as being commercially available. Some isolates have also been found to be probiotic in humans (and are also commercially available), but it's been mentioned that clinical trials have not been performed on many of them yet.

Other Applications 
B. licheniformis also shows possible applications in bioremediation, biomineralization, and biofuels as more examples.

Natural genetic transformation

B. licheniformis is naturally competent for genetic transformation.   Natural genetic transformation is a sexual process involving DNA transfer from one bacterium to another through the intervening medium, and the integration of the donor sequence into the recipient genome by homologous recombination.

Pathogenicity and Food Spoilage 
Bacillus licheniformis has been found to cause infection in several cases of immunocompromised patients. B. licheniformis has been found to be the causative agent of ventriculitis, ophthalmitis, bacteremia, peritonitis, and endocarditis. B. licheniformis is also known to contaminate food, especially dairy, as well as causing "ropiness" in bread. There is evidence that contamination may be a result of a toxin.

Identification through testing 
Below is a list of differential techniques and results that can help to identify Bacillus licheniformis from other bacteria and Bacillus species.
 Anaerobic Growth: Positive
 Voges Proskauer test: Positive
 Acid produced from
 D-glucose: Positive
 L-arabinose: Positive
 D-mannitol: Positive
 Starch hydrolysis: Positive
 Nitrate reduction: Positive
 Degradation of tyrosine: Negative
 Growth at
 10 °C: Negative
 50 °C: Positive
 55 °C: Positive
 Utilization of citrate: Positive

References

External links 
 Isolation, Identification, and Characterization of a Feather Degrading Bacteria, Williams et al., 1990
 Bacterial Degradation of Black and White Feathers, Goldstein et al., 2003
 Complete genome of Bacillus licheniformis ATCC14580 - publication
 Microbial nanotechnologists, August 1, 2009
 Bacillus licheniformis genome
Type strain of Bacillus licheniformis at BacDive -  the Bacterial Diversity Metadatabase

licheniformis